Clayfield is a suburb in the City of Brisbane, Queensland, Australia.

Geography 
Clayfield is bordered to the north by Nundah, to the east by Ascot and Hendra, to the west by Wooloowin and to the south by Albion.

Its name derives from the fine white-grey sedimentary clay mined in Albion, between Morgan and Sykes Street, used in the brickworks that once existed between Oriel Road and Reeve Street near Sandgate Road. This industry, once known as "the clay fields", was instrumental in the residential surge of European settlement of inner-north Brisbane. 
 
Kalinga Park and the Kalinga locality lay on the northern limit. Clayfield also encompasses the locality of Eagle Junction

History
In 1874 a Baptist Church opened in Hendra/Clayfield.

In October 1885, "Sefton Estate" consisting of 254 16 perch allotments were auctioned by John Cameron, Auctioneer. The land for sale is re-subdivisions of subdivisions 2 to 3 of Portions 78 and 79, Parish of Toombul. A map advertising the auction provides a local sketch of the area.

In January 1886, 392 allotments of land of "Noble Estate", were advertised for auction by R.D. Graham & Son, Auctioneers. A map advertising the auction states the land is situated on the main Sandgate Road and Kedron Brook.

In February 1888, "Isleton Estate" made up of 236 allotments were auctioned by R. R. Cottell. A map advertising the auction states the Estate was exactly opposite Eagle Junction Railway Station with 30 trains passing a day.

In June 1888 "The Eagle Farm and Sandgate Estate", made up of 75 16 perch allotments, was advertised for auction by G.T. Bell, Auctioneer. The land for sale is re-subdivisions of subdivisions 13 to 25 of allotment 4 of Portion 5, Parish of Toombul. A map advertising the auction includes a local sketch of the area that shows close proximity to the railway line. 

A United Methodist Free Church was built circa 1889 at present-day 221 Bonney Avenue. In 1901, not wishing to be part of the amalgamation of the Methodist denominations into the new Methodist Church of Australasia, the congregation decided to became Eagle Junction Congregational Church. In December, a Sunday School hall was added to the northern side of the church on the corner of Norman Parade. 

Clayfield State School opened on 8 July 1895. In July 1901 it was renamed Eagle Junction State School. 

On October 28, 1899, sixty allotments of land of "Albion Hill Estate", being re-subdivisions 1 to 60, of subdivision of section 3 of portion 162, Parish of Enoggera, were advertised for auction by Isles, Love & Co. The advertising map states the estate's proximity to Albion Train Station, with 76 trains daily. The land for sale was situated between Camden St, Albion, and Ford St and Old Sandgate Rd (now Bonney Ave), Clayfield.

A stump-capping ceremony for Wooloowin Methodist Church was held on Saturday 30 November 1901. The site was on Old Sandgate Road at the junction with Bayview Terrace (now 170 Bonney Avenue). While the church was being built, it was destroyed by a cyclone in January 1901. The church was re-built and opened on Sunday 13 April 1902 by Reverend Robert Stewart, President of the Queensland Methodist Conference. In 1975 Wooloowin Methodist Church amalgamated with Eagle Junction Congegational Church (at 211 Bonney Avenue) to form the Bonney Avenue Cooperative Parish. Following the amalgamation that created the Uniting Church in Australia in 1977, it was renamed Clayfield Uniting Church and decided to operate exclusively from the site of the Wooloowin Methodist Church. The Eagle Junction Congregational Church and its adjacent hall at 5 Norman Parade wer sold into private ownership; both buildings still exist and are listed on the Brisbane Heritage Register. The foundation stone of the current Clayfield Uniting Church building was laid on Sunday 2 March 1986 by Reverend Leslie Tiplin Vickery and it was opened and dedicated on 5 April 1987 by Reverend Barry Dangerfield.

In February 1920 "The Drane Estate", made up of 71/2 allotments plus a substantial residence on 2 1/2 allotments, was advertised for auction by Thorpe & Sharp, Auctioneers. A map advertising the auction states the estate is overlooking Clayfoeld Station, 6 minutes from Eagle Junction Railway Station and 3 minutes from Clayfield Tram Terminus.

In April 1920 "Insulae Park Estate" made up of 23 allotments was advertised for auction by Thorpe & Son, Auctioneers. A map advertising the auction states the estate is 5 minute walk to Clayfield Station and Tram.

St Agatha's Catholic Primary School opened on 27 January 1925.

St Rita's College opened on 31 January1926.

Clayfield College opened on 9 February 1931.

The median age of the Clayfield population was 34 years of age, 3 years below the Australian median. 70.3% of people living in Clayfield were born in Australia, compared to the national average of 69.8%; the next most common countries of birth were New Zealand 3.7%, England 3.6%, India 2.5%, Philippines 0.8%, and China 0.8%. 81.9% of people spoke only English at home; the next most popular languages were 1% Italian, 1% Mandarin, 0.7% Punjabi, 0.7% Korean, and 0.7% Hindi.

Heritage listings
Clayfield has a number of heritage-listed sites, including:
 138 Adelaide Street East: Casa Mara
 140 Adelaide Street East: Tresco
 143 Adelaide Street East: Mardan
 165 Adelaide Street East: Rangemoor
 Adjacent Alexandra Road: Railway footbridge
 159 Alexandra Road: Francisca
 12 Armagh Street: Tressylian
 19 Batman Street: Cotswold
 19 Bayview Terrace: Cranagh (Federation bungalow)
 48 Bayview Terrace: Eagle Junction State School, Memorial gates, fence & trees
 27 Bellevue Terrace: former Scots Presbyterian Manse
 38 Bellevue Terrace: Old English Interwar house
 5 Bonney Avenue: Bellevue Court
 103 Bonney Avenue: St Marks Anglican Church
 146 Bonney Avenue: Pagoda Villa
 221 Bonney Avenue: former Congregational Church & Hall
 36 Christian Street: Ben Nevis
 19 Craven Street: Delcotta
 56 Crombie Street: Moortangi
 25 Enderley Road: Stanley Hall
 40 Enderley Road: Ralahyne
 57 Enderley Road: California bungalow
 64 Enderley Road: Linstarfield
 71 Enderley Road: Girrawheen
 72 Enderley Road: Enderley Road Heritage Precinct
 77 Enderley Road: California bungalow
 83 Enderley Road: Breffney
 24 Ford Street: Springfield
 24 Franz Road: Warley
 36 Franz Road: Ferguslea
 30 Gregory Street: The Coverts
 34 Gregory Street: Elveden
 20 Jolly Street: Interwar Functionalist house
 24 Jolly Street: Interwar Mediterranean house
 30 Jolly Street: Interwar Queenslander house
 276 Junction Road: former Shop & Residence
 30 Liverpool Road: Waitara
 3 London Road: Lyndhurst
 8 London Road: Turrawan (Clayfield House)
 21 Milne Street: Lalala
 18 Norman Parade: Bunburra
 22 Norman Parade: Federation Queenslander house
 26 Norman Parade: Federation bungalow
 51 Norman Parade: Federation Queenslander house 
 52 Oriel Road: St Agatha's Catholic Church
 71 Oriel Road: World War I bungalow
 94 Oriel Road: Kent Lodge
 7 Queens Road: Scots Presbyterian Memorial Church
 8 Reeve Street: Telephone exchange
 26 Rees Avenue: Ben Nevis Lodge gates & fence
 Sandgate Road: Tram Shelter & Fig Trees
 436 Sandgate Road: Hampton Court
 462 Sandgate Road: Shop
 464 Sandgate Road: Coraki Court
 641 Sandgate Road: former Turrawan Private Hospital
 707 Sandgate Road: former Commonwealth Bank
 18 Tarranalma Avenue: Tarranalma
 23 Victoria Street: St Colomb's Anglican Church & War Memorial
 21 Vine Street: Second Church of Christ, Scientist Church, Sunday School & Reading Room
 32 Wagner Road: Clayfield Memorial School of Arts
 59 Wellington Street: Beaufort Hill

Education 

Eagle Junction State School is a government primary (Prep-6) school for boys and girls at 49 Roseby Avenue. In 2018, the school had an enrolment of 877 students with 66 teachers (52 full-time equivalent) and 30 non-teaching staff (17 full-time equivalent). It includes a special education program.

St Agatha's Primary School is a Catholic primary (Prep-6) school for boys and girls at 6 Hunter Lane. In 2018, the school had an enrolment of 338 students with 24 teachers (21 full-time equivalent) and 17 non-teaching staff (11 full-time equivalent).

St Rita's College is a Catholic secondary (7-12) school for girls at 41 Enderley Road. In 2018, the school had an enrolment of 1005 students with 74 teachers (71 full-time equivalent) and 44 non-teaching staff (39 full-time equivalent).

Clayfield College is a private primary and secondary (Prep-12) school for boys and girls at 23 Gregory Street. In 2018, the school had an enrolment of 565 students with 69 teachers (64 full-time equivalent) and 40 non-teaching staff (34 full-time equivalent).

Amenities
Churches that are located in Clayfield include:
 Clayfield Baptist Church
 Clayfield Gospel Hall
 St Agatha's Catholic Church
 St Mark's Anglican Church
 Scots Presbyterian Church
Despite its name, Clayfield Uniting Church is at 170 Bonney Avenue in neighbouring Wooloowin.

Clayfield was served by an electric tram line which ran along Sandgate Road until its closure on 13 April 1969. It is now served by bus and train services from the nearby Clayfield railway station and Eagle Junction railway station. Along the capital road (Alexandra Road), a canopy of poinciana and oak trees produce a 'New England' canopy effect.

Notable residents 
 Charles Evans CMG, Commissioner of Railways
 Timothy Joseph O'Leary (1925–1987), flying doctor
 Richard Frank Tunley, developer of educational resources for blind children
 Mary Hyacinthe Petronel White (1900–1984), women's rights campaigner and local government councillor

References

External links

 
 
 

 
Suburbs of the City of Brisbane